WWJO (98.1 FM) is a radio station in St. Cloud, Minnesota airing a country music format. The station is owned by Townsquare Media. The station's studios, along with Townsquare's other St. Cloud stations, are located at 640 Lincoln Avenue SE, on St. Cloud's east side.

Broadcasting from northern Benton County with a 100,000-watt transmitter and a 1,000-foot tower, WWJO enjoys a large coverage area across central Minnesota.

External links
official website

Radio stations in St. Cloud, Minnesota
Country radio stations in the United States
Townsquare Media radio stations